Radost Bokel (born 4 June 1975 in Bad Langensalza) is a German actress.

Life 
Bokel works as an actress in Germany. As a child, she starred in the film Momo. Later she appeared in several other German films. In 2008, Bokel married singer Tyler Woods with whom she has a son. The marriage ended in divorce in 2015; Bokel lives in Germany.

Filmography 
 1986: Momo
 1986: 
 1986: Valhalla (German voice)
 1987: The Secret of the Sahara (TV)
 1989: Rivalen der Rennbahn (TV)
 1989: Schuldig (TV)
 1989: Tatort: Herzversagen
 1994: Der Fahnder (TV)
 1994: Einsatz für Lohbeck (TV)
 1995: Wolffs Revier (TV)
 1996: Doppelter Einsatz: Rallye mit Hindernissen
 1997: Das erste Semester
 1998: Dr. med. Mord
 1998: First love: Die große Liebe (TV)
 2002: Klinik unter Palmen: Kuba (TV)
 2003: Klinik unter Palmen (TV)
 2005: SOKO Kitzbühel (TV)
 2006: Das Traumhotel (TV)
 2006: SOKO Rhein-Main (TV)
 2006: Der Staatsanwalt (TV)
 2007–2011: Der Staatsanwalt
 2013: Ein Fall für die Anrheiner
 2015: Kreuzfahrt ins Glück

Awards 
 Bambi for Momo

References

External links 
 Official website
 
 

1975 births
Living people
People from Bad Langensalza
German film actresses
German child actresses
Actors from Raleigh, North Carolina
Ich bin ein Star – Holt mich hier raus! participants
Actors from Thuringia